Shahba ( / ALA-LC: Shahbā) is a city located  south of Damascus in the Jabal el Druze in As-Suwayda Governorate of Syria, but formerly in the Roman province of Arabia Petraea. Known in Late Antiquity as Philippopolis (in Arabia), the city was the seat of a Bishopric (see below), which remains a Latin titular see.

History

Roman history 

The oasis settlement now named Shahba had been the native hamlet of the Roman emperor Philip the Arab. After Philip became emperor in 244 CE, he dedicated himself to rebuilding the little community as a colonia. The contemporary community that was replaced with the new construction was so insignificant that one author states that the city can be considered to have been built on virgin soil, making it the last of the Roman cities founded in the East.

The city was renamed Philippopolis (a name with homonyms) in dedication to the emperor, who is said to have wanted to turn his native city into a replica of Rome herself. A hexagonal-style temple and an open-air place of worship of local style, called a kalybe, a triumphal arch, baths, a starkly unornamented theatre faced with basalt blocks, a large structure that has been interpreted as a basilica, and the Philippeion (illustration, right) surrounded by a great wall with ceremonial gates, were laid out and built following the grid plan of a typical Roman city.

The public structures formed what author Arthur Segal has called a kind of "imported façade". The rest of the urban architecture was modest and vernacular. The city was never completed as building seems to have stopped abruptly after the death of Philip in 249.

The new city followed the extremely regular Roman grid-plan, with the main colonnaded Cardo maximus intersecting a colonnaded Decumanus Maximus at right angles near the center. Lesser streets marked off insulae, many of which never saw houses constructed upon them.

Ottoman rule and later 
In 1596 Shahba appeared in the Ottoman tax registers as Sahba and was part of the nahiya of Bani Miglad in the Hauran Sanjak. It had an entirely Muslim population consisting of 8 households and 3 bachelors, who paid a fixed tax rate of 40%  on wheat, barley, summer crops, goats and/or beehives; a total of 5,050 akçe.

Because it was far from population centers that would have required cut stone for building and might have quarried it from those deserted in Philippopolis, Shahba today contains well-preserved ruins of the ancient Roman city.

A museum located in the city exhibits some beautiful examples of Roman mosaics. The especially rich iconography of the figurative mosaic on the theme, The Glory of the Earth, discovered in 1952 in the so-called "Maison Aoua", is conserved today in the museum of Damascus and has proved a rich resource for iconographers.

The relatively well-preserved Roman bridge at Nimreh is located in the vicinity.

Modern era 

In the 18th century Druze populations moved into the area. A Christian presence exists in the city to the present.

Climate
Shahba has a cold semi-arid climate (Köppen climate classification BSk).

See also 
 List of Catholic dioceses in Syria
 Druze in Syria
 Christianity in Syria

References

Bibliography

 Eubel, Konrad  Hierarchia Catholica Medii Aevi, vol. 2, p. 215; vol. 3, p. 273; vol. 4, p. 280; vol. 5, p. 314; vol. 6, p. 337
 Gams, Pius Bonifacius, 1931, Series episcoporum Ecclesiae Catholicae, Leipzig, p. 435
 
 Lequien, Michel, 1740, Oriens christianus in quatuor Patriarchatus digestus, Paris, vol. II, coll. 861-862

External links 
 GCatholic - (former &) titular bishopric
 Map of the town, Google Maps

Cities in Syria
Populated places in Shahba District
Archaeological sites in as-Suwayda Governorate
Roman towns and cities in Syria
Roman sites in Syria
Druze communities in Syria